In Full Bloom is the second album released by American funk band Rose Royce on the Whitfield label in July 1977. It was produced by Norman Whitfield. The album was remastered and reissued with bonus tracks in 2016 by Big Break Records.

Chart performance
The album topped the R&B albums chart.  It also reached number nine on the Billboard 200, the band's highest position on the chart.  The album spawned two Billboard R&B Top Ten singles, "Do Your Dance (Part 1)" and "Ooh Boy", which reached number four and number three respectively.  A third single, "Wishing on a Star", was not as successful in the US, but was a huge hit on the UK Singles Chart, peaking at number three. Another single, "It Makes You Feel Like Dancin'", was released in the UK and peaked at number 16.

Track listing

Personnel
Rose Royce
Gwen Dickey – lead vocals
Kenny Copeland – trumpet, lead vocals
Kenji Brown – guitar, lead vocals
Lequeint "Duke" Jobe – bass, vocals
Michael Nash – keyboards
Henry Garner – drums, vocals
Freddie Dunn – trumpet
Michael Moore – saxophone
Terry Santiel – congas

Additional musicians
Mark Davis – keyboards, ARP, piano
Melvin "Wah Wah" Watson – guitar
James Gadson – drums
Jack Ashford – tambourine, vibes, hotel sheet

Production
Norman Whitfield – producer, arranger, mastering engineer
 Leanard Jackson –Chief recording engineer and mixing
 Steve Smith – recording engineer, mastering engineer
Steve Maslow – recording engineer, mastering engineer
Bill Whitfield – album coordinator
Paul Riser – orchestral direction
Ed Thrasher – art direction
Eric Chan/Gribbitt! – album design
Shusei Nagaoka – cover illustration
Ron Slenzak – photography

Charts

Singles

See also
List of number-one R&B albums of 1977 (U.S.)

References

External links
 

1977 albums
Rose Royce albums
Albums produced by Norman Whitfield
Whitfield Records albums
Albums with cover art by Shusei Nagaoka